BH Dani is a Bosnian language weekly magazine published in Bosnia and Herzegovina since 1992.

History

BH Dani, also known as Dani is a weekly politics magazine published in Sarajevo. The first issue of the magazine was distributed from 25 August 1992, during the first year of the Siege of Sarajevo. It featured texts by many notable regional authors, such as dr. Kasim Begić, Miljenko Jergović, Boro Kontić, Mustafa Mujagić, Alma Lazarevska, Ozren Kebo, dr. Mustafa Imamović. The editor-in-chief was Senad Pećanin.

Dani continued its publication under harsh conditions throughout and despite of the Siege. The magazine received the Award for Best Paper in Bosnia and Herzegovina in 1993 by the former Association of Journalists of BiH (today BH Novinari), award of the Open Society Foundation BIH and the Olof Palme Prize in 1998. The paper was financially supported by the Swedish Helsinki Committee, Press Now and the Open Society Foundations.

In 2010, the magazine was bought by Oslobođenje, when Pećanin stepped down as the editor-in-chief. Dani continues to be published with the current editor-in-chief Saša Rukavina.

Notable columnists and journalists (in the past issues)
 Semezdin Mehmedinović
 Aleksandar Hemon
Dženana Karup-Druško
 Miljenko Jergović
Karim Zaimović
Nerzuk Ćurak
Mile Stojić
Vildana Selimbegović

Sister publications
Oslobođenje - daily newspaper
 Auto Dani - a monthly car magazine supplement
 Ljepota & Zdravlje - a monthly health and beauty magazine supplement
 Biblioteka Dani - a book publishing house

References

1992 establishments in Bosnia and Herzegovina
Magazines established in 1992
Political magazines
News magazines published in Europe
Mass media in Sarajevo
Weekly news magazines